Nanteuil is a  commune in the Deux-Sèvres department in western France. It may also refer to:

Places
Nanteuil-le-Haudouin, a comune in the Oise a department in northern France
Nanteuil, Vichel-Nanteuil, a village in a commune in the Aisne department in northern France

People
Nanteuil (actor), French playwright and actor
Claire Julie de Nanteuil (1834-1897), French children's writer